Cirsotrema browni is a species of sea snail, a marine gastropoda mollusk in the family Epitoniidae.

Original description
    Poppe G.T. (2008) New Fissurellidae, Epitoniidae, Aclididae, Mitridae and Costellariidae from the Philippines. Visaya 2(3): 37-63. [Published August 2008].

References

External links
 Worms Link

Epitoniidae